was the 83rd emperor of Japan, according to the traditional order of succession.

Tsuchimikado's reign spanned the years from 1198 through 1210.

Genealogy
He was the firstborn son of Emperor Go-Toba. His mother was Ariko (在子) (1171–1257), daughter of Minamoto no Michichika (源通親).

Tsuchimikado's Imperial family lived with him in the Dairi of the Heian Palace. His family included three sons by three different consorts:

Empress (Chūgū): Ōinomikado (Fujiwara) no Reishi (大炊御門（藤原）麗子) later Onmeimon’in (陰明門院), Ōinomikado Yorisane’s daughter

Lady-in-waiting: Tsuchimikado (Minamoto) no Michiko (土御門（源）通子; d.1221), Minamoto Michimumen’s daughter
First daughter: Princess Haruko (春子女王; 1210-1230)
Second daughter: Imperial Princess Akiko (覚子内親王; 1213-1285) later Ogimachi’in (正親町院)
Third son: Imperial Prince Priest Ninjo (仁助法親王; 1215-1262)
Fourth son: Imperial Prince Priest Jojin (静仁法親王; 1216-1296) 
Sixth son: Prince Kunihito (邦仁王), later Emperor Go-Saga

Court Lady: Mimasaka-Naishi (美作掌侍), Takashina Nakasuke’s daughter
 Princess
 Son: Imperial Prince Priest Donin (道仁法親王; 1209-1263）

Court Lady: Minamoto Sadamitsu’s daughter
Fifth daughter: Princess Hideko (秀子女王)

Court Lady: Owari-no-Tsubone (尾張局), Priest’s daughter
Son: Imperial Prince Priest Sonsyu (尊守法親王; 1210-1260）

Court Lady: Priest Shine’s daughter
Son: Imperial Prince Priest Sonjo (尊助法親王; 1217-1290）

Court Lady: Jibukyo-no-tsubone (治部卿局), Priest’s Daughter
Son: Imperial Prince Priest Dōen (道円法親王; 1210-1240）
Daughter: Princess Nobuko (信子女王)

Court Lady: Omiya-no-Tsubone (大宮局), Minamoto Arimasa’s daughter
 Daughter: Imperial Princess Teruko (曦子内親王) later Senkamon-in (仙華門院)

Court Lady: (Fujiwara), Priest’s Daughter
Son: Imperial Prince Priest Sainin (最仁法親王; 1227-1295）

Court Lady: Kunaikyō-no-tsubone (宮内卿局), Fujiwara Norimitsu’s daughter
 Daughter: Princess Tomoko (知子女王)

Court Lady: (Fujiwara), Priest’s Daughter
 Son: Zojin

Court Lady: Sakyōdaibu-no-Tsubone, Priest’s Daughter
 Daughter: Imperial Princess Junko (諄子内親王; d.1260)

Court Lady: Tanba-no-Tsubone, Priest’s Daughter
 Daughter: Princess Koreko (是子女王)

Mother Unknown:
 daughter, adopted by Prince Hokuroku
 Kaison (懐尊)
 Jakue (寂恵)

Events of Tsuchimikado's life
In 1198, he became emperor upon the abdication of Emperor Go-Toba, who continued to exercise Imperial powers as cloistered emperor.

 1198 (Kenkyū 9, 11th day of the 1st month): In the 15th year of Go-Toba-tennōs reign (後鳥羽天皇十五年), the emperor abdicated; and the succession (senso) was received by his eldest son.
 1198 (Kenkyū 9, 3rd month): Emperor Tsuchimikado is said to have acceded to the throne (sokui).
 1199: Shortly after Tsuchimikado's reign began, Minamoto no Yoritomo died.
 1203: Yoritomo's successor as head of the Kamakura shogunate, Minamoto no Yoriie, was assassinated; and former emperor Go-Toba was responsible for good relations with the shogunate when it was headed by Minamoto no Sanetomo from 1203 through 1219.
 1210: Go-Toba persuaded Tsuchimikado to abdicate in favor of his younger brother, who would become known as Emperor Juntoku.

In Kyōto, Minamoto no Michichika took power as steward, and in Kamakura, in 1199, upon the death of Minamoto no Yoritomo, Hōjō Tokimasa began to rule as Gokenin.

Tsuchimikado removed himself from Kyoto, traveling first to Tosa Province (now known as Kōchi Prefecture); and later, he moved to Awa province (now known as Tokushima Prefecture), where he died in exile.

 1231: The former emperor died at age 35.

Tsuchimikado's official Imperial tomb is in Kyoto. The emperor is venerated at a memorial Shinto shrine (misasagi). This mausoleum shrine is formally named Kanegahara no misasagi.

Kugyō
Kugyō (公卿) is a collective term for the very few most powerful men attached to the court of the Emperor of Japan in pre-Meiji eras.

In general, this elite group included only three to four men at a time.  These were hereditary courtiers whose experience and background would have brought them to the pinnacle of a life's career.  During Tsuchimikado's reign, this apex of the  Daijō-kan included:
 Sesshō, Konoe Motomichi, 1160–1233.
 Sesshō, Kujō Yoshitsune, 1169–1206.
 Daijō-daijin, Kujō Yoshitsune.
 Sadaijin
 Udaijin
 Naidaijin
 Dainagon

Eras of Tsuchimikado's reign
The years of Tschuimikado's reign are more specifically identified by more than one era name or nengō.
 Kenkyū     (1190–1199)
 Shōji (1199–1201)
 Kennin            (1201–1204)
 Genkyū     (1204–1206)
 Ken'ei      (1206–1207)
 Jōgen       (1207–1211)

Ancestry

See also
 Emperor of Japan
 List of Emperors of Japan
 Imperial cult
 Emperor Go-Tsuchimikado
 Minase Shrine

Notes

References
 Brown, Delmer M. and Ichirō Ishida, eds. (1979).  Gukanshō: The Future and the Past. Berkeley: University of California Press. ;  OCLC 251325323
 Ponsonby-Fane, Richard Arthur Brabazon. (1959).  The Imperial House of Japan. Kyoto: Ponsonby Memorial Society. OCLC 194887
 Takekoshi, Yosaburō. (1930). The Economic Aspects of the History of the Civilization of Japan. New York: Macmillan. OCLC 13839617.  Reprinted by Taylor and Francis, 2003. 
 Titsingh, Isaac. (1834). Nihon Odai Ichiran; ou,  Annales des empereurs du Japon.  Paris: Royal Asiatic Society, Oriental Translation Fund of Great Britain and Ireland.  OCLC 5850691
 Varley, H. Paul. (1980).  Jinnō Shōtōki: A Chronicle of Gods and Sovereigns. New York: Columbia University Press. ;  OCLC 59145842

Japanese emperors
1196 births
1231 deaths
Emperor Tsuchimikado
Emperor Tsuchimikado
Emperor Tsuchimikado
Emperor Tsuchimikado
12th-century Japanese monarchs
13th-century Japanese monarchs